Open-Silicon is a semiconductor company founded in 2003. 

Open-Silicon was acquired by OpenFive in September, 2021.

Corporate history
Open-Silicon was founded in 2003 by Naveed Sherwani, Satya Gupta and Scott Houghton. Initial funding was provided by Sequoia Capital, Norwest Venture Partners, and InterWest Partners. In December 2007 Unicorn Investment Bank acquired 75% of Open-Silicon for $190M, with the rest of the company employee-owned.

In May 2007, Open-Silicon acquired Zenasis Technologies, a maker of processor optimization EDA software. This technology has also been expanded by Open-Silicon to focus on low power design and process variability management.

In 2009 Open-Silicon acquired design services firm Silicon Logic Engineering (SLE). This acquisition has enhanced the company's derivative IC design capabilities. In 2010 the company opened new facilities in Research Triangle Park, North Carolina, and Pune, India, to provide additional support for derivative IC design.

In 2012, Open-Silicon acquired and grew substantial design operations in Pakistan and Taiwan.

On August 17, 2020, SiFive acquires Open-Silicon and names it OpenFive, an independent business unit of SiFive.

On Sept. 1, 2022, Canadian semiconductor licensing company Alphawave acquires SiFive’s OpenFive business unit for $210 million.

Products and services
Open-Silicon's business model is called the OpenMODEL.

References

External links
Open-Silicon Home page
SiFive Home page
OpenFive Home page
Alphawave IP Home page

Companies established in 2003
Fabless semiconductor companies
Semiconductor companies of the United States